Worthington Industries, Inc. is a global diversified metals manufacturing company based in Columbus, Ohio. It is a steel processor and manufacturer of pressure vessels, such as propane, oxygen and helium tanks, hand torches, refrigerant and industrial cylinders, camping cylinders, exploration, recovery and production products for global energy markets; water system tanks for storage, treatment, heating, expansion and flow control, and compressed natural gas storage cylinders. The company also manufactures framing systems for mid-rise buildings and steel pallets and racks for shipping. It is the largest independent processor of flat-rolled steel in the United States. The company takes steel from steel producers and processes it for customers in industries including automotive, lawn and garden, construction, hardware, office furniture, electrical control, leisure and recreation, appliance, agriculture and HVAC.

The company's pressure vessels business, founded in 1971, includes the manufacture of Propane cylinders used for gas grills; refrigerant cylinders used for air conditioning systems; tanks for storage in water treatment, heating, expansion and flow control; high-pressure cylinders for industrial gases; air  tanks used for diving; self-contained breathing apparatus for firefighters and others; compressed gas tanks for hand torches; compressed natural gas (CNG) storage tanks for the alternative fuels market; liquid nitrogen containers for the life sciences, health care and animal husbandry markets; cylinders for transporting and storing high pressure hydrogen gas; and consumer products such as helium gas balloon kits. Cylinders and tanks are made from welded or seamless steel, from aluminum, or from fiber composite materials.

Worthington Industries is the only manufacturer of disposable 1lb propane cylinders in North America. The 16.1 oz. cylinders are sold under a variety of brand names including Worthington, Bernzomatic, and Coleman. These cylinders are commonly used by consumers for soldering, brazing, and welding, and to fuel cooking appliances like camp stoves and portable BBQs used in recreational settings like campgrounds, parks, and stadium parking lots.

Joint ventures
 ClarkDietrich Building Systems, a joint venture with ClarkWestern Building Systems and Dietrich Metal Framing that manufactures light-gauge metal framing and finishing products, systems and services for commercial and residential construction.
 Serviacero Worthington, a joint venture with Serviacero Planos that provides services such as slitting, pickling, multi-blanking and cutting-to-length to customers in a variety of industries including automotive, appliance, electronics and heavy equipment.
 Spartan Steel Coating, a joint venture that produces light gauge hot-dipped galvanized steel, primarily for value-added automotive applications.
 TWB Company, a joint venture with WISCO Tailored Blanks that produces laser welded blanks for the automotive industry.
 Worthington Samuel Coil Processing (WSCP), a joint venture with Samuel Steel that processes hot roll steel for use in many applications, including automotive.
 WAVE (Worthington-Armstrong Venture), a joint venture with Armstrong World Industries, that produces all of the suspended metal ceiling grids supplied by Armstrong.
 Worthington Specialty Processing (WSP), a partnership with U.S. Steel, toll processes more than 750,000 tons of wide sheet steel annually for the auto industry.

History
Worthington Industries was founded in 1955 by John H. McConnell, a steel salesman. McConnell saw an opportunity for custom-processed steel and purchased his first load of steel by borrowing $600 against his 1952 Oldsmobile. He founded the company in Columbus, Ohio, where it is still headquartered.

In his first year of business, McConnell grossed $342,000; his profit was $11,000. Throughout the late 1950s and 1960s, he continued to add processing facilities. In 1966, he started sharing his profits with the people he worked with. In 1968, Worthington Industries made its first public stock offering of 150,000 shares at $7.50 per share. Throughout the 1980s, the company continued to expand rapidly.

In 1996, John McConnell's son, John P. McConnell, took over as chairman and CEO. He had worked for the company for more than 20 years, having started as a general laborer and later advancing to sales, operations and personnel.

In 2000, Worthington Industries moved to the New York Stock Exchange.

In June 2017, the company acquired Amtrol for $283 million. Amtrol produces pressure cylinders and water system components, and is the largest provider of expansion tanks to the plumbing and HVAC markets in the United States, 

In September 2020, former company President Andy Rose was named Worthington Industries' President & CEO, succeeding long-time Chairman and CEO John P. McConnell.

In January 2021, the company made two acquisitions. The first was the acquisition of German valve and component company PTEC Pressure Technology GmbH. The second was the acquisition of General Tools & Instruments Company LLC (General Tools), a provider of over 1,200 feature-rich, specialized tools, primarily for measuring and marking, found in supply houses, home centers, and hardware stores worldwide.

References

External links

1955 establishments in Ohio
1960s initial public offerings
American companies established in 1955
Companies based in the Columbus, Ohio metropolitan area
Companies listed on the New York Stock Exchange
Conglomerate companies established in 1955
Manufacturing companies based in Ohio
Manufacturing companies established in 1955